The Antelope Valley of southwest Millard County, Utah, United States, is a small  long valley, adjacent the Ferguson Desert and  southwest of Sevier Lake. The valley is just east of the Nevada border, with Snake Valley and the Burbank Hills.

The Desert Biosphere Reserve forms the entire southeast, central & south valley border, where the small, low elevation arid Tunnel Springs Mountains are located.

Description
The Antelope Valley is southwest-northeast trending with a drainage northeast into the Ferguson Desert area. The valley also drains from the northeast flank of the Mountain Home Range adjacent the Nevada border to the southwest.

Access
Utah State Route 21 transects the upper region of the valley at the alluvial fans of the Mountain Home Range. Route 21 crossing the valley is a NNW trending section, coming from Frisco and Milford, Utah to the town site closest to the valley, Garrison, Utah, northwest of Antelope Valley, and on the Utah-Nevada state line.

See also

 List of valleys of Utah

References

External links

Valleys of Utah
Valleys of Millard County, Utah
Valleys of the Great Basin